Mr. Romance is a 2005 US tongue-in-cheek reality television show which aired on Oxygen. It was created by Gene Simmons and hosted by Fabio.

Mr. Romance featured a group of 12 male contestants, mentored by Fabio, entering a "romance academy" hoping to win a shot at novel cover fame. Each week the contestants would compete in romance-related events like romance novel cover photo shoots and learning to dance, with each contestant rated on their facility in the activity. The two lowest-scoring contestants at the end of the regular season were eliminated and the remaining ten contestants went on to compete in the Mr. Romance Pageant to select the winner. Fabio delivered show-ending homilies on the lesson of each episode.

At the pageant, Randy Richwood was crowned Mr. Romance.

Contestants
 Andrew Larsen: Fisherman from Alaska
 Mark Mast: Model and Personal Trainer from Montreal Canada
 Bruce Blauer: Bartender from Montana
 Charles Gladish: Carpenter and Erotic Dancer from Idaho
 Hakan Emden: Hair Model and Soccer Coach, lives in LA but from Turkey
 Justin Dryer: Graphic Artist and Hula Dancer from Hawaii
 Adam Hatley: Actor and Model from California
 Randy Ritchwood: Truck Driver from New Jersey
 Scott Alexander: Model from Missouri
 Tom "TJ" Jones: Actor from Cleveland Ohio
 Anthony Catanzaro: Trainer and Professional Dancer from New York

External links
 

2005 American television series debuts
2005 American television series endings
2000s American reality television series
Oxygen (TV channel) original programming